Happy is a town in Randall and Swisher Counties in the U.S. state of Texas. The population was 678 at the 2010 census. The Randall County portion of Happy is part of the Amarillo, Texas Metropolitan Statistical Area.

Toponymy
Happy derives its name from Happy Draw, a stream named in the 19th century by the team of cowboys who were happy to find water there. It has frequently been noted on lists of unusual place names. The town's motto is "The Town Without A Frown".

Geography

According to the United States Census Bureau, the town has a total area of 1.1 square miles (2.8 km), all of it land.

Demographics

2020 census

As of the 2020 United States census, there were 602 people, 226 households, and 111 families residing in the town.

2010 census
As of the census of 2010,  678 people, 267 households, and 182 families resided in the town.  The population density was 607.5 people per square mile (233.5/km).  The 295 housing units  averaged 277.0 per square mile (106.4/km).  The racial makeup of the town was 88.05% White, 0.29% African American, 1.77% Native American, 8.11% from other races, and 1.77% from two or more races. Hispanics or Latinos of any race were 17.31% of the population.

Of the 267 households, 30.7% had children under the age of 18 living with them, 59.2% were married couples living together, 5.2% had a female householder with no husband present, and 31.8% were not families; 28.1% of all households were made up of individuals, and 16.1% had someone living alone who was 65 years of age or older.  The average household size was 2.42, and the average family size was 2.97.

In the town, the population was distributed as 25.8% under the age of 18, 9.3% from 18 to 24, 26.7% from 25 to 44, 19.3% from 45 to 64, and 18.9% who were 65 years of age or older.  The median age was 38 years. For every 100 females, there were 95.5 males.  For every 100 females age 18 and over, there were 100.0 males.

The median income for a household in the town was $28,393, and for a family was $39,375. Males had a median income of $26,964 versus $17,917 for females. The per capita income for the town was $14,618.  About 10.9% of families and 13.4% of the population were below the poverty line, including 12.1% of those under age 18 and 10.0% of those age 65 or over.

As of 2011, the population of Happy was decreasing by 10% annually because of water shortage.

Education
The City of Happy is served by the Happy Independent School District and home to the Happy High School Cowboys.

Notable people 

 Barry Clark, one of the pioneers of the Very Large Array, was born in Happy
 Buddy Knox, Happy is the birthplace of Rockabilly musician

The Uncle Sam Band

Happy is the home of the Uncle Sam Band which was organized in the 1930s and directed by Happy High School Band Director James Douglass Forbus.  The Uncle Sam Band led a parade in Amarillo, Texas, during a visit by President Franklin D. Roosevelt.

Famous sportsman

Happy is the home town of Joe Cephis Fortenberry, who was the captain, high scorer and MVP of the first U.S. Olympic Men's Basketball Team. They won the first gold medal ever awarded in the sport. He also won two AAU national championships, one with the Globe Refiners of McPherson, Kansas, and one with the Phillips 66ers. He was AAAU All America four times. He is credited with inventing the dunk shot, ending the jump ball after made goals, and causing the goaltending rule to be instituted.

Climate

According to the Köppen climate classification system, Happy has a semiarid climate, BSk on climate maps. The town has been hit by two (E)F2 tornadoes – the first on May 5, 2002, and a second on March 13, 2021.

Environment
The former Attebury Grain Storage Facility within the town was added to the Superfund National Priorities List by the United States Environmental Protection Agency in April, 2009 because hazardous chemicals were found in the soil and groundwater. Carbon tetrachloride, which was used to extinguish a fire at the storage facility in 1962, was found in a municipal water well, and several private wells.

In popular culture
The film Happy, Texas, which was named for the town and set there, was not filmed there.

References

External links
 "HAPPY, TX", Handbook of Texas Online

Towns in Randall County, Texas
Towns in Swisher County, Texas
Towns in Texas
Towns in Amarillo metropolitan area